Getúlio Vargas Freitas Oliveira Júnior or simply Getúlio Vargas Junior (born January 22, 1983), is a Brazilian retired football goalkeeper.

Career
Getulio grew up playing in the Brazil youth system of C.R. Flamengo, where he also turned professional with the first team. At age 17, Getúlio signed his first professional contract with Flamengo. Getúlio had no easy task ahead of him with Brazilian national goalkeeper Júlio César (now with Inter Milan), being the number 1 goalkeeper at that time.

For the U-17 of Flamengo, Getulio won many titles such as the Brazilian U-17 championships and a World Championship in Dubai, where he was elected the best goalkeeper of the tournament. With Flamengo, Getúlio was part of the team who won the Rio de Janeiro State Cup in 2004, and the Brazilian Cup in 2006.

At the beginning of 2007, Getúlio was sent on loan to Brazilian's 1st division power Fortaleza FC, where he quickly became one of the main players of the team, playing home games under 80 thousand Fortaleza's Stadium fans. In the 1st division of the Ceara State Championship, Getulio was elected top goalkeeper of the competition. The success was recognized by big teams in Brazil and in Europe.

Getúlio transferred to KVC Westerlo in the premiership of the Belgian Pro League. With Westerlo, Getulio played 2 complete seasons from 2007–2008, but after his loan expired, his club wanted him back in Brazil. His outstanding play and impression he left in Belgium did not go unnoticed, as KVC Westrlo signed him to a 1-year contract in 2009 when their starting keeper got injured. Because of his play, scouts from across Europe & Brazil tried to entice him to come to Spain, Italy and Germany.

In January 2010, Getúlio received a lucrative offer from Rio de Janeiro's 1st division Duque de Caxias. Again, he was elected the best goalkeeper of the competition and was also elected by "O Lance" newspaper, Top Goalkeeper with "Lowest Goals Against Average" in the competition. Standing out as a top young Keeper again, Europe came calling.

As his contract came to an end in Brazil, Getulio received offers from teams in South America, MLS USA and across Europe. At this time, Getulio decided to sign for famed club Vitória de Setúbal, in the Portuguese Primeira Liga. He is nearing the end of his contract and is looking to making the move to Spain, Belgium or USA, due to offers to be with top flight clubs.

Honours
Rio de Janeiro State League: 2004
Brazilian Cup: 2006
Ceará State League: 2007
Campeonato Brasileiro: 2009
Rio de Janeiro League: 2014
Voted 2nd best keeper Campeonato Carioca: 2013
Voted 3rd best keeper Campeonato Carioca:2014

References

External links
 sambafoot
 CBF
 zerozero.pt
 soccerterminal
 kvcwesterlo.be
 https://www.youtube.com/watch?v=xx69Ucmp-n0

1983 births
Living people
Brazilian footballers
Brazilian expatriate footballers
CR Flamengo footballers
Fortaleza Esporte Clube players
K.V.C. Westerlo players
Orlando Pirates F.C. players
Bangu Atlético Clube players
Association football goalkeepers
Expatriate footballers in Belgium
Brazilian expatriate sportspeople in Belgium
Expatriate footballers in Portugal
Brazilian expatriate sportspeople in Portugal
People from São Gonçalo, Rio de Janeiro
Sportspeople from Rio de Janeiro (state)